Fluid balance is an aspect of the homeostasis of organisms in which the amount of water in the organism needs to be controlled, via osmoregulation and behavior, such that the concentrations of electrolytes (salts in solution) in the various body fluids are kept within healthy ranges. The core principle of fluid balance is that the amount of water lost from the body must equal the amount of water taken in; for example, in humans, the output (via respiration, perspiration, urination, defecation, and expectoration) must equal the input (via eating and drinking, or by parenteral intake). Euvolemia is the state of normal body fluid volume, including blood volume, interstitial fluid volume, and intracellular fluid volume; hypovolemia and hypervolemia are imbalances. Water is necessary for all life on Earth. Humans can survive for 4 to 6 weeks without food but only for a few days without water.

Profuse sweating can increase the need for electrolyte replacement. Water-electrolyte imbalance produces headache and fatigue if mild; illness if moderate, and sometimes even death if severe. For example, water intoxication (which results in hyponatremia), the process of consuming too much water too quickly, can be fatal. Deficits to body water result in volume contraction and dehydration. Diarrhea is a threat to both body water volume and electrolyte levels, which is why diseases that cause diarrhea are great threats to fluid balance.

Applications

Water consumption
The amount of water varies with the individual, as it depends on the condition of the subject, the amount of physical exercise, and on the environmental temperature and humidity. In the US, the Reference Daily Intake (RDI) for water is 3.7 liters per day (L/day) for human males older than 18, and 2.7 L/day for human females older than 18 including water contained in food, beverages, and drinking water. The common misconception that everyone should drink two liters (68 ounces, or about eight and a half 8-oz glasses) of water per day is not supported by scientific research. Various reviews of all the scientific literature on the topic performed in 2002 and 2008 could not find any solid scientific evidence that recommended drinking eight glasses of water per day. For example, people in hotter climates will require greater water intake than those in cooler climates. An individual's thirst provides a better guide for how much water they require rather than a specific, fixed number. A more flexible guideline is that a normal person should urinate 4 times per day.

A constant supply is needed to replenish the fluids lost through normal physiological activities, such as respiration, perspiration and urination. Food contributes 0.5 to 1 L/day, and the metabolism of protein, fat, and carbohydrates produces another 0.25 to 0.4 L/day, which means that 2 to 3 L/day of water for men and 1 to 2 L/day of water for women should be consumed as fluid to meet the Reference Daily Intake (RDI).

Trace elements
In terms of mineral nutrients intake, it is unclear what the drinking water contribution is. However, inorganic minerals generally enter surface water and ground water via storm water runoff or through the Earth's crust. Treatment processes also lead to the presence of some minerals. Examples include calcium, zinc, manganese, phosphate, fluoride and sodium compounds. Water generated from the biochemical metabolism of nutrients provides a significant proportion of the daily water requirements for some arthropods and desert animals, but provides only a small fraction of a human's necessary intake.

There are a variety of trace elements present in virtually all potable water, some of which play a role in metabolism. For example, sodium, potassium and chloride are common chemicals found in small amounts in most waters, and these elements play a role in body metabolism. Other elements such as fluoride, while arguably beneficial in low concentrations, can cause dental problems and other issues when present at high levels. Water is essential for the growth and maintenance of our bodies, as it is involved in a number of biological processes.

Medical use

Effects of illness
When a person is ill, fluid may also be lost through vomiting, diarrhea, and hemorrhage. An individual is at an increased risk of dehydration in these instances, as the kidneys will find it more difficult to match fluid loss by reducing urine output (the kidneys must produce at least some urine in order to excrete metabolic waste.)

Oral rehydration therapy

Oral rehydration therapy (ORT), is type of fluid replacement used as a treatment for dehydration. In an acute hospital setting, fluid balance is monitored carefully. This provides information on the patient's state of hydration, kidney function and cardiovascular function.

 If fluid loss is greater than fluid gain (for example if the patient vomits and has diarrhea), the patient is said to be in negative fluid balance. In this case, fluid is often given intravenously to compensate for the loss.
 On the other hand, a positive fluid balance (where fluid gain is greater than fluid loss) might suggest a problem with either the kidney or cardiovascular system.

If blood pressure is low (hypotension), the filtration rate in the kidneys will lessen, causing less fluid reabsorption and thus less urine output.

An accurate measure of fluid balance is therefore an important diagnostic tool, and allows for prompt intervention to correct the imbalance.

Routes of fluid loss and gain
Fluid can leave the body in many ways. Fluid can enter the body as preformed water, ingested food and drink and to a lesser extent as metabolic water which is produced as a by-product of aerobic respiration (cellular respiration) and dehydration synthesis.

Input
A constant supply is needed to replenish the fluids lost through normal physiological activities, such as respiration, sweating and urination. Water generated from the biochemical metabolism of nutrients provides a significant proportion of the daily water requirements for some arthropods and desert animals, but provides only a small fraction of a human's necessary intake.

In the normal resting state, input of water through ingested fluids is approximately 1200 ml/day, from ingested foods 1000 ml/day and from aerobic respiration 300 ml/day, totaling 2500 ml/day.

Regulation of input

Input of water is regulated mainly through ingested fluids, which, in turn, depends on thirst. An insufficiency of water results in an increased osmolarity in the extracellular fluid. This is sensed by osmoreceptors in the organum vasculosum of the lamina terminalis, which trigger thirst. Thirst can to some degree be voluntarily resisted, as during fluid restriction.

The human kidneys will normally adjust to varying levels of water intake. The kidneys will require time to adjust to the new water intake level. This can cause someone who drinks a lot of water to become dehydrated more easily than someone who routinely drinks less.

Output
 The majority of fluid output occurs via the urine, approximately 1500 ml/day (approx 1.59 qt/day) in the normal adult resting state.
 Some fluid is lost through perspiration (part of the body's temperature control mechanism) and as water vapor in exhaled air. These are termed "insensible fluid losses" as they cannot be easily measured. Some sources say insensible losses account for 500 to 650 ml/day (0.5 to 0.6 qt.) of water in adults, while other sources put the minimum value at 800 ml (0.8 qt.).  In children, one calculation used for insensible fluid loss is 400 ml/m2 body surface area.
 In addition, an adult loses approximately 100 ml/day of fluid through feces.
 For females, an additional 50 ml/day is lost through vaginal secretions.

These outputs are in balance with the input of ~2500 ml/day.

Regulation of output
The body's homeostatic control mechanisms, which maintain a constant internal environment, ensure that a balance between fluid gain and fluid loss is maintained.  The anti-diuretic hormones vasopressin (ADH) and aldosterone play a major role in this.
 If the body is becoming fluid-deficient, there will be an increase in the secretion of these hormones, causing fluid to be retained by the kidneys and urine output to be reduced.
 Conversely, if fluid levels are excessive, secretion of these hormones is suppressed, resulting in less retention of fluid by the kidneys and a subsequent increase in the volume of urine produced.

Antidiuretic hormone

If the body is becoming fluid-deficient, this will be sensed by osmoreceptors in the vascular organ of lamina terminalis and subfornical organ. These areas project to the supraoptic nucleus and paraventricular nucleus, which contain neurons that secrete the antidiuretic hormone, vasopressin, from their nerve endings in the posterior pituitary. Thus, there will be an increase in the secretion of antidiuretic hormone, causing fluid to be retained by the kidneys and urine output to be reduced.

Aldosterone

A fluid-insufficiency causes a decreased perfusion of the juxtaglomerular apparatus in the kidneys. This activates the renin–angiotensin system. Among other actions, it causes renal tubules (i.e. the distal convoluted tubules and the cortical collecting ducts) to reabsorb more sodium and water from the urine. Potassium is secreted into the tubule in exchange for the sodium, which is reabsorbed.
The activated renin–angiotensin system stimulates the zona glomerulosa of the adrenal cortex which in turn secretes the hormone aldosterone. This hormone stimulates the reabsorption of sodium ions from distal tubules and collecting ducts. Water in the tubular lumen cannot follow the sodium reabsorption osmotically, as this part of the kidney is impermeable to water; release of ADH (vasopressin) is required to increase expression of aquaporin channels in the cortical collecting duct, allowing reabsorption of water.

See also
Drinking water

References

Human homeostasis
Electrolyte disturbances
Nutrition

de:Hypovolämie#Isovolämie, Normovolämie